The Saint-Joseph Chapel was a historic church on the grounds of Saint-Paul College in Lille, France. It was built in 1887, and was demolished in February 2021 to build a new campus.

Construction 
The chapel was the work of architect .

Demolition 
The demolition was criticised and described an "iniquitous act" by journalist Stéphane Bern, and attempted to be prevented by former Minister of Culture Franck Riester.

References 

19th-century Roman Catholic church buildings in France
Roman Catholic churches completed in 1887
Roman Catholic churches in Lille
2021 disestablishments in France
Demolished buildings and structures in France
Buildings and structures demolished in 2021
Byzantine Revival architecture in France
Destroyed churches in France